Dominik Fischnaller (born 20 February 1993) is an Italian luger who has competed since 2002. He has won silver and two bronze medals at Junior World Championships. Fischnaller won the Junior Luge World Cup for the 2010–11 season. His best Luge World Cup overall finish was third 2013–14 Luge World Cup.

Fischnaller is an athlete of the Centro Sportivo Carabinieri.

Biography
Fischnaller competed for Italy in the Men's singles luge event at the 2014 Winter Olympics in Sochi. He placed sixth behind the bronze medal effort of teammate Armin Zöggeler. Fischnaller also competed for Italy in the Men's singles luge event at the 2018 Winter Olympics in Pyeongchang. He came fourth while his cousin Kevin came seventh.

Personal life
Dominik Fischnaller is the younger brother of Hans Peter Fischnaller and cousin of Kevin Fischnaller.

References

External links

1993 births
Living people
Italian male lugers
Olympic lugers of Italy
Lugers at the 2014 Winter Olympics
Lugers at the 2018 Winter Olympics
Lugers at the 2022 Winter Olympics
Medalists at the 2022 Winter Olympics
Olympic bronze medalists for Italy
Olympic medalists in luge
Italian lugers
Sportspeople from Brixen
Lugers of Centro Sportivo Carabinieri
Germanophone Italian people